The Mystery Man is the fifth solo album by jazz pianist Mike Garson, and was released in 1990.

Track listing

References

Mike Garson albums
1990 albums